Jean-Herbert Austin (born 23 February 1950) is a Haitian retired footballer. Austin attended college at New York University, where he was twice named to the All-American men's soccer team and three times named to the New York State All-Star Team. In 1998, he was inducted to the NYU Sports Hall of Fame. By 1974 he was a member of Violette AC, and was in the Haiti squad for the 1974 FIFA World Cup, but did not play in the competition.

References

1950 births
Sportspeople from Port-au-Prince
1974 FIFA World Cup players
Haitian footballers
Haitian expatriate footballers
Haiti international footballers
Haitian emigrants to the United States
NYU Violets men's soccer players
Violette AC players
Expatriate soccer players in the United States
Haitian expatriate sportspeople in the United States
Soccer players from Dallas
Living people
Association football defenders